Rubén Darío Aguilera (born 26 January 1978) is a Paraguayan footballer.

He played for Deportes Antofagasta.

Honours

Player
General Caballero 
 Paraguayan Segunda División (1): 2010 División Intermedia

External links
 
 

1978 births
Living people
Paraguayan footballers
Paraguayan expatriate footballers
General Caballero Sport Club footballers
Silvio Pettirossi footballers
Club Guaraní players
Club Real Potosí players
2 de Mayo footballers
Club San José players
The Strongest players
C.D. Antofagasta footballers
Chilean Primera División players
Expatriate footballers in Chile
Expatriate footballers in Bolivia
Paraguayan expatriate sportspeople in Chile
Paraguayan expatriate sportspeople in Bolivia
Association football forwards